Yuri Valeryevich Medvedev (born 3 January 1990) is a Russian former football player.

Club career
He made his professional debut in the Russian Professional Football League for FC Arsenal-2 Tula on 12 July 2014 in a game against FC Avangard Kursk.

He made his Russian Football Premier League debut on 21 March 2015 for FC Arsenal Tula in a game against PFC CSKA Moscow.

References

External links
 Career summary by sportbox.ru

1990 births
Living people
Russian footballers
Russian Premier League players
FC Dynamo Moscow reserves players
FC Arsenal Tula players
Association football defenders